The Indonesian National Armed Forces Strategic Intelligence Agency (Indonesian: Badan Intelijen Strategis Tentara Nasional Indonesia) abbreviated BAIS TNI is a state institution that specifically handles military intelligence and is under the command of the Indonesian National Armed Forces headquarters. BAIS time-frames for actual and forecasted intelligence and strategy analysis for the future (short, medium, and long term) for the Armed Forces Commander and for the Ministry of Defence.

History

PsiAD
BAIS started as the Army Psychological Center (Pusat Psikologi Angkatan Darat abbreviated PSiAD) belonging to the Army Headquarters (MBAD) to balance the Central Intelligence Bureau (Biro Pusat Intelijen abbreviated BPI) under the leadership of Subandrio, which absorbed a lot of PKI sympathists.

Pusintelstrat
At the beginning of the New Order era, the Ministry of Defense and Security established the Strategic Intelligence Center (Pusat Intelijen Strategis abbreviated as Pusintelstrat) with PSiAD members being mostly liquidated into it.

Pusintelstrat is led by the Chairman of the G-I Defense and Security Brigadier General L.B. Moerdani. The position continued to be held until L.B. Moerdani became Commander of the Indonesian Armed Forces. In this era, military intelligence had an operational intelligence agency called the Kopkamtib Intelligence Task Force. This agency in the Kopkamtib era played a full role as an Operational Intelligence Unit whose authority was very superior.

Badan Intelijen ABRI (BIA)
In 1980, the Pusintelstrat and the Kopkamtib Intelligence Task Force were merged into the ABRI Intelligence Agency (Badan Intelijen Angkatan Bersenjata Republik Indonesia abbreviated BIA). The BIA was commanded by the commander of ABRI, while operational duties of BIA are led by the Deputy Chief. "ABRI" (from Angkatan Bersenjata Republik Indonesia) was the name of the Armed Forces of Indonesia during the new order era.

Badan Intelijen Strategis (BAIS)
In 1986, in response to the challenges, BIA was changed to BAIS. This change had an impact on organizational restructuring which must be able to cover and analyze all aspects of the Strategic Defense, Security and National Development.

After a long process, finally in 1999 (post reformation) the institution was legally recognized as Badan Intelijen Strategis Tentara Nasional Indonesia (shortened BAIS TNI).

Organization
BAIS oversees Indonesian Defence attaches posted in various Indonesian diplomatic missions throughout the world.

Leadership of BAIS
BAIS is headed by a three-star armed forces general holding the title of Kepala BAIS (shortened Ka Bais) and is assisted by a Vice Head which is a two-star armed forces general holding the title of Wakil Kepala BAIS (shortened Waka Bais). Currently it is headed by Lieutenant General Joni Supriyanto which held office since 21 October 2020, and the vice head is Major General Achmad Riad. The leadership of BAIS reports to the Commander of the Armed Forces (Panglima TNI).

Directorates 
BAIS organization is quite secretive. According to Presidential Decree No. 66/2019, there are 8 Directorates under BAIS, all are named by letters. Only 7 directorates have known function as in 2016:

 A Directorate (Indonesian: Direktorat A) for Domestic Military Intelligence
 B Directorate (Indonesian: Direktorat B) for Foreign Military Intelligence
 C Directorate (Indonesian: Direktorat C) for Defense and Military Intelligence
 D Directorate (Indonesian: Direktorat D) for Military Security Intelligence
 E Directorate (Indonesian: Direktorat E) for Psychological Operations
 F Directorate (Indonesian: Direktorat F) for Administration and Finance
 G Directorate (Indonesian: Direktorat G) for Research and Production
 H Directorate (Indonesian: Direktorat H) is dedicated for unknown function.

Parental Units
BAIS oversees several parental units known as Satuan Induk Badan Intelijen Strategis (Satinduk BAIS TNI). It is commanded by a Brigadier General.

Scope Duties

Intelligence education
Basic training
Secondary training
Strategic training

Intelligence Functional Duties
 Investigation
 Security
 Materials / Assets
 Personnel
 News / Information
 Raising / Coaching

See also
 Indonesian State Intelligence Agency (BIN)
 Military intelligence
 Clandestine operation
 Government of Indonesia
 Indonesian National Armed Forces

References

Military intelligence agencies
Military units and formations of Indonesia
Military units and formations established in 1986
Military of Indonesia
Government agencies of Indonesia
Indonesian intelligence agencies